Bar Municipality is one of the municipalities of Montenegro. The center is the town Bar. The municipality is located at the Adriatic coast in the southeast Montenegro. According to the 2011 census, the city proper had 17,649 inhabitants, while the total population of Bar Municipality was 42,068.

Geography and tourism
Bar Municipality is located on the coastal western border of Montenegro on the shore of the Adriatic Sea. To the east is the largest lake in the Balkans, Lake Skadar. To the west, across the sea, is Italy.

The natural area around Bar is mostly untouched and is rich in vegetation. The municipality stretches to the southern shore of Skadar lake and encompasses Krajina region. This area is visited for its leisure activities and hiking. Smaller settlements near Bar, such as Dobra Voda, Sutomore and Čanj, are a destination for sunbathing, as they incorporate long sandy beaches.

Beaches
In the north is Čanj, which has a  sandy beach. A boat takes tourists from Čanj to the Kraljičina Plaža (the Queen's beach). It lies below a natural wall of sedimentary rock. Further south is  Maljevik Beach. Near the medieval monastery complex of Ratac is Crvena Plaža (the Red beach), named after the colour of its fine sand. The beach is surrounded by a pine forest and located about a hundred m from the main road to Bar. The Bar city beach is located in front of King Nikola I's palace.

There are also beaches on the shore of Lake Skadar.

Flora and fauna
The coastal part of Bar supports maquis shrubland with oak, holm oak, laurel, myrtle, Spanish broom, oleander, hawthorn, sloe, thorn, butcher's broom, and asparagus. To the north and the mountains, there are oak and beech forests.
Citrus fruits including tangerine, orange, and lemon grow in the Bar area as do pomegranates, olives, grapevines, and figs. Ginkgo biloba grows in the park of King Nikola's palace. Skadar Lake is rich in birdlife including the pelican. Game animals are found in Ostros, Rumija, Lisinj, Sutorman, and Sozina and include rabbit, badger, fox, wolf, and boar. At the Bar seashore one finds various kinds of shells, snails, echinodermata, cephalopoda and crayfish.

Demographics

Divisions and settlements 
The municipality consists of 77 settlements, four of which, Bar, Stari Bar, Sutomore and Virpazar are urban, while the rest are rural or suburban. The municipality is divided into 12 local communities (mjesna zajednica): Topolica (part of Bar), Polje, Bjeliši, Burtaiši, Sutorman, Stari Bar, Šušanj, Sutomore, Mrkojevići, Krajina, Šestan and Crmnica.
A census in 2011 recorded 42,048 people in the Bar Municipality.

Historic population:

Ethnicity 

Ethnic composition of the municipality in 2011:

Religion

The main religion in Bar is Orthodox Christianity. However, there are churches from both the Eastern Orthodox and Catholic traditions as well as mosques built by Ottomans in the Islamic tradition. Bar is the birthplace of Saint Jovan Vladimir. In 1089, the Roman Catholic Archdiocese of Bar, was founded and included most of Montenegro and Serbia.

Local administration

Gallery

References

 
Municipalities of Montenegro